Okrouhlička (until 1945 Šejdorf) is a municipality and village in Havlíčkův Brod District in the Vysočina Region of the Czech Republic. It has about 300 inhabitants.

History
The first written mention of Okrouhlička is from 1307.

Administrative parts
The village of Skřivánek is an administrative part of Okrouhlička.

References

Villages in Havlíčkův Brod District